Beit Safafa (lit. "House of the summer-houses or narrow benches") is a Palestinian town along the Green Line, with the vast majority of its territory in East Jerusalem and some northern parts in West Jerusalem.

Since the 1949 agreements, the neighborhood had been divided by the Green Line.  Until 1967, the East Jerusalem part remained under Jordanian rule while the northern parts became under Israeli rule. Beit Safafa covers an area of 1,577 dunams. In 2010, Beit Safafa had a population of 5,463.

History
During the Crusader  era, the village was known as Bethafava or Bethsaphase.  Baldwin I  granted the village  as a fief  to the Knights Hospitallers sometime before  September 1110.     A tower in the village is dated to the Crusader period.

In the 1360-1370, part of the revenue from Beit Safafa went to the Madrasa Al-Manjakiyya (com.) on the Haram esh-Sharif in Jerusalem.

Ottoman era
The village  was incorporated into the Ottoman Empire in 1517 with all of Palestine, and in 1596 it appeared in the  tax registers as being in  the Nahiya of Quds of the Liwa of Quds. It had a population of 41 Muslim households who paid taxes on wheat, barley, olives, grapes or fruit trees, and goats or beehives; a total of  11,800 akçe. 1/4 of the revenue went to a waqf.  

In 1838 Robinson noted Beit Sufafa as a Muslim village in the Beni Hasan district, west of Jerusalem.

Victor Guérin visited  the village in 1863, and described it as having some thirty houses, some solidly built and very old.  An Ottoman village list from about 1870 showed that   Beit Safafa  had  a population of 169, with a total of  41 houses, though the population count included men, only. 

In 1883, the Palestine Exploration Fund's  "Survey of Western Palestine",   described it as "a small village in flat open ground, with a well to the north".

In 1896 the population of  Bet Safafa   was estimated to be about 180 persons.

British Mandate era
At the time of the 1922 census of Palestine, Beit Safafa had a population of 716, all Muslim, which increased to 997 Muslims and 24 Christians in the 1931 census. 

In the 1945 statistics the population was 1,410; 1,370 Muslims and 40 Christians, and the land area was 3,314 dunams, according to an official land and population survey. Of this, 2,814 dunams were Arab owned, 391 were Jewish owned, and 109 was public property.  Of this, 1,030 dunams were for plantations and irrigable land, 1,149 for cereals, while 71 dunams were built-up areas.

After the 1948 Arab-Israeli War 
In the wake of the 1948 Arab-Israeli War, the village was divided in two. The southern part was in the Jordanian-annexed  West Bank, while the northern part, originally in no man's land, was transferred to Israel with the signing of 1949 Armistice Agreements, and was later unilaterally annexed to Jerusalem by Israel.

After the war, a section of the Jaffa-Jerusalem railway remained under Jordanian control. Following the 1949 Armistice Agreements, it was agreed that Jordan would transfer control of this section of the track to Israel, in order to enable Israel Railways to restart rail service to Jerusalem. As a result, the area south of the railway line was part of the Jordanian-controlled West Bank and the railway line itself and the area to the north, was part of Israeli-controlled Jerusalem. Service on the line resumed on August 7, 1949.

During the period when the neighborhood was divided, a two-foot high barbed wire fence was erected down the middle of the main street with Arab Legionnaires and Israeli soldiers guarding on each side.

In 1961, the Jordanian census showed a population of 1,025 in  Beit Safafa.

After the Six-Day War 
After the Six-Day War  in 1967, the whole of Beit Safafa has been under Israeli occupation, and the fence between the east and the west part was taken down. Residents of the Israeli side had Israeli citizenship while those on the south side were given, like East Jerusalem residents, Jerusalem ID cards and residency, while retaining Jordanian citizenship. Also following the 1967 war, Palestinian Christians with Israeli citizenship from Nazareth, Jaffa, and Jerusalem moved to Beit Safafa, expanding the small community, and several Jewish families moved in as well.

According to ARIJ, Israel has expropriated land from Sharafat and Beit Safafa for the construction of three Israeli settlements:
1,529 dunams have been taken for Gilo,
166 dunams have been taken for Har Homa,
285  dunams have been taken for  Giv’at Hamatos

Education

Beit Safafa has three schools: Beit Safafa Elementary School, Beit Safafa High School and al-Salam School, a school for special needs children. Beit Safafa schools follow both the Israeli Bagrut curriculum and the Palestinian Tawjihi curriculum. In 1997, the Hand in Hand School for Bilingual Education was founded in Beit Safafa. The school, supported by the Israeli Ministry of Education and the Jerusalem Municipality, offers a bilingual curriculum in Hebrew and Arabic, with joint classes for Jews and Arabs. In 2012, 530 Arab and Jewish children were enrolled in the school.

In 2012, Bakehila, an organization founded by Erel Margalit of Jerusalem Venture Partners to aid children from underprivileged neighborhoods, opened an educational enrichment center in Beit Safafa.

Urban development plans

In 2012, an urban development plan approved by the Jerusalem Municipality announced a project to build four new roads in Beit Safafa.

In early 2013, the Jerusalem Municipality began construction of an eight-lane highway that would bisect Beit Safafa. Israeli author David Grossman wrote that the plan was adopted without public scrutiny and would harm the character of the neighborhood. The residents claimed that the plan was illegal and construction commenced without warning. After petitioning the local courts and the Israeli Supreme Court, the residents succeeded in halting the project.

Naomi Tzur, deputy mayor of Jerusalem and holder of the urban planning portfolio, said that the residents were "taking advantage of the political situation to turn a local concern into an international story. When the residents of Beit Hakerem conducted their fight over their part of Begin Highway, the international media wasn’t interested. This is simply a residents’ fight against its municipality for better compensations and better infrastructure, and it’s a perfectly justifiable fight and part of democracy."

In June 2013, the Supreme Court ruled that the 1-mile stretch of highway crossing Beit Safafa would cause unacceptable damage to the residents' quality of life. Beit Safafa’s lawyers say  the construction of an acoustically insulated tunnel that puts the road underground and protects the area’s geographic integrity might be an acceptable solution.

Archaeology
Several winepresses have been found at Beit Safafa, which have been dated back to the Iron Age. In a salvage dig in Beit Safafa, archaeologists discovered fifty graves dated first century BC-first century CE, of which 41 were excavated. In 2013, an archaeological survey-excavation was conducted on the site by Alex Wiegmann on behalf of the Israel Antiquities Authority (IAA).

See also
Al-Mashrabiya Building

Notable people

 Sayed Kashua

References

Bibliography

 
 (p. 30)  
  

 p. 215

External links
  Welcome To Bayt Safafa
Survey of Western Palestine, Map 17:  IAA, Wikimedia commons 
Beit Safafa and Sharafat (Fact Sheet),  Applied Research Institute–Jerusalem (ARIJ)
Beit Safafa & Sharafat Town Profile, ARIJ
Beit Safafa & Sharafat aerial photo, ARIJ
The Mashrabiya House, Beit Safafa, ARIJ
Cadastral map of Beit Safafa region, 1933, 1:10,000, Eran Laor Cartographic Collection, The National Library of Israel

Arab neighborhoods in Jerusalem